Linga Sound may refer to:
Linga Sound, Orkney, between the islands of Linga Holm and Stronsay
Linga Sound, Shetland, between the islands of Whalsay and West Linga